Tau tubulin kinase 2 is a protein in humans that is encoded by the TTBK2 gene.

This gene encodes a serine-threonine kinase that putatively phosphorylates tau and tubulin proteins. Mutations in this gene cause spinocerebellar ataxia type 11 (SCA11); a neurodegenerative disease characterized by progressive ataxia and atrophy of the cerebellum and brainstem.

References

Further reading

External links
  GeneReviews/NCBI/NIH/UW entry on Spinocerebellar Ataxia Type 11